Back from Samoa is the debut full-length album by the American punk rock band Angry Samoans. It was released in 1982 on Bad Trip Records.

Production
The album contains a cover of The Chambers Brothers' "Time Has Come Today."

Critical reception
Trouser Press wrote that "the brief, well-played songs on Back From Samoa have cool titles ... but the lyrics are rarely as clever." Alternative Press called the album "hilarious," writing that it "rocks like a spastic colon." The Spin Alternative Record Guide wrote that "the extremism of this viciously witty, explosive thrash is compelling, perhaps because it's rooted in self-hatred."

Track listing
 "Gas Chamber" – 1:02 ("Metal Mike" Saunders/Gregg Turner)
 "The Todd Killings" – 0:38 (Saunders/Turner)
 "Lights Out" – 0:52 (Saunders/Turner)
 "My Old Man's a Fatso" – 1:32 (Saunders)
 "Time Has Come Today" – 2:07 (Joseph Chambers/Willie Chambers)
 "They Saved Hitler's Cock" – 1:40 (Jeff Dahl/Todd Homer/Turner)
 "Homo-Sexual" – 0:52 (J. Falwell)
 "Steak Knife" – 1:00 (Saunders/Turner)
 "Haizman's Brain Is Calling" – 1:56 (Saunders/Turner)
 "Tuna Taco" – 0:38 (Homer)
 "Coffin Case" – 0:39 (Saunders)
 "You Stupid Jerk" – 0:23 (Saunders)
 "Ballad of Jerry Curlan" – 3:08 (P.J. Galligan/Turner/Bill Vockeroth)
 "Not of This Earth" – 1:11 (Saunders/Turner)

Personnel
 "Metal Mike" Saunders - vocals, guitar
 Gregg Turner - vocals, guitar
 P.J. Galligan - guitar
 Todd Homer - bass guitar, vocals
 Bill Vockeroth - drums
 Ronn Spencer - album design

References 

1982 debut albums
Angry Samoans albums
Bad Trip Records albums
Triple X Records albums